Crazy Paradise is a 1962 Danish comedy film directed by Gabriel Axel and starring Dirch Passer.

Cast
Dirch Passer as Angelus Bukke
Ove Sprogøe as Simon
Hans W. Petersen as Thor Bukke
Ghita Nørby as Edith Ibenholdt
Paul Hagen as Vicar Poul Ibenholdt
Bodil Steen as Minister Bertha Viginius
Karl Stegger as Per Mortensen
Kjeld Petersen as Ove Biermann
Lily Broberg as Anne-Sofie
Lone Hertz as Grete
Judy Gringer as Ursula
Kai Holm as Prime Minister Staldhybel
Jørgen Ryg as Von Adel
Axel Strøbye as Hjalmar
Gunnar Lemvigh as Trommesen
Poul Müller as Thomas Asmussen
Valsø Holm as Janus
Keld Markuslund as Disk
Arthur Jensen as Trefrans
Hugo Herrestrup as Frederik
Gunnar Strømvad as Laurids
 as Jens
Erik Paaske as Børge
Lotte Tarp as Karen
Elsebeth Larsen as Maren-Balle
Henning Moritzen as Narrator / fortælleren

References

Further reading
Ebbe Villadsen: Danish Erotic Film Classics (2005)

External links

Crazy Paradise at the Danish National Filmography

1962 films
1960s Danish-language films
1962 comedy films
Films directed by Gabriel Axel
Danish comedy films